The Nova Scotia Teachers Union was organized in 1895–96 to unify and elevate the teaching profession in the Canadian province of Nova Scotia. As the unified voice for the advocacy and support of all its members, the NSTU promotes and advances the teaching profession and quality public education. Members include some 9,100 public school teachers including specialist teachers, speech language pathologists and school psychologists. It also represents teachers who work for the Atlantic Provinces Special Education Authority in Nova Scotia, Prince Edward Island and New Brunswick.

The NSTU serves as the primary advocate of its members by protecting and enhancing economic benefits, improving working conditions, supporting personal well being, keeping members informed and promoting opportunities to participate.

During a dispute with the Nova Scotia government in 2016/17, they negotiated three contracts that they supported, however the membership rejected all three. The Nova Scotia Government has put forward a bill to legislate the teachers new contract.

References

Footnotes

Bibliography

Further reading

External links 
 

1895 establishments in Canada
Canadian Teachers' Federation
Education trade unions
Educational organizations based in Nova Scotia
Educational organizations established in 1895
Trade unions established in 1895
Trade unions in Nova Scotia